The Coolaghmore sheela na gig was discovered in 1975 at the 13th century church at Coolaghmore (also Cooliaghmore or Cooliagh More), County Kilkenny, Ireland during clearance work at the graveyard. It is thought to have been buried in the 19th century. According to local sources, it had been found in a well in Kyle previously and been brought to Coolaghmore Graveyard. It was then donated to Rothe House Museum via Kilkenny Archaeological Society where it is on display in a bricked up window in the shop of the first of the three houses since about 2012. The sites and monuments records number (at Rothe House) is KK019-026170.

Description 
The sheela na gig is on display in an upright position, but since it has been moved from its original location, this might not have been the original orientation. The sheela's head is pear-shaped and earless (other examples have very large ears) with a calm expression on her face. She has a thin neck with the collar bones protruding, in accordance with the often emaciated depiction of the upper body. The ribs are slightly incised. While her left arm is hanging/ lying by her side, her right hand is touching the vulva which has a deep hole below. Other than that, the vulva is not exaggerated like many other examples. Barbara Freitag believes that the larger left hand might be holding an object. The right leg is bend with the foot touching the upper inner thigh of the left leg and the heel pointing towards the vulva with the left foot turned inwards.

3D model 
In 2018, Gary Dempsey created a photogrammetry model of the sheela-na-gig in Rothe House which is accessible on Sketchfab.

Gallery

See also 
 Fethard Abbey Sheela-na-gig
 Liathmore Sheela-na-gig
 Kiltinan Church Sheela-na-gig

References 

Sheela na gigs in Ireland
Archaeological sites in County Kilkenny